Lowrey is an unincorporated community and census-designated place (CDP) in Cherokee County, Oklahoma, United States. It was first listed as a CDP prior to the 2020 census.

The CDP is in northern Cherokee County, bordered to the north by Rocky Ford, to the northwest by Teresita, to the southwest by Johnson Prairie, and to the south by Moodys.

Demographics

References 

Census-designated places in Cherokee County, Oklahoma
Census-designated places in Oklahoma